Kalipado is a settlement on the island of Zakynthos of Greece. In 1981, the population of Kalipado was around 564 inhabitants. By 1991, the population had slightly declined to around 505 inhabitants. In 2011, the population was 736 inhabitants.

There is significant history attributed to the origins of this village in the area of Arkadioi, a municipal unit of the Southern Ionian Sea chain of islands that go from north, opposite Albania to the south, opposite the mid-Peloponesean southern coast of lower Greece. Its history embraces the era of Magna Graecia and Roman Empire through its many years of being an important colony of Venice, Milano and England, up through 1860 when the Ionian Islands joined post Ottoman-occupied Greece.

References

Populated places in Zakynthos